A hoagie roll or hero roll is a type of long roll used to prepare hoagie sandwiches. Hoagie rolls are sometimes toasted before being used to prepare a sandwich.

Ingredients used in hoagie roll preparation may include flour, egg, milk, vegetable oil, salt, sugar and yeast. Some versions include sesame seeds atop the roll, which may add extra flavor and textural elements. Gluten-free and vegan hoagie roll recipes have been devised. 

The hoagie roll is used to prepare the Philadelphia cheesesteak sandwich and various other submarine sandwiches.

See also
 Marraqueta
 List of bread rolls
 Sandwich bread

References

Further reading

External links
 Stradley, Linda (2004). History of Hoagies, Submarine Sandwiches, Po' Boys Sandwiches, Dagwood Sandwiches, & Italian Sandwiches. Whatscookingamerica.net.
Breads